C.C. Lemon is a Japanese soft drink created by Suntory. It is known for its lemon flavor, and for its advertisements featuring characters from the American animated series The Simpsons. It has been sold in Vietnam since 2014.

Sizes
C.C. Lemon comes in a variety of sizes. Below is a table stating the volume, type of container, and number of lemons worth of vitamin C.

Mascots

The Simpsons
The Simpsons have appeared in numerous commercials for C.C. Lemon. In Japan, The Simpsons are anecdotally better known for being featured in C.C. Lemon commercials than for their television show. References to the yellow color of the Simpsons features heavily in the marketing.

In addition to the many television commercials, The Simpsons also appear on a wide range of merchandise for the product. The promotional items include 500 mL beverage holders, pens, coasters, magnets, lunchboxes, and foldable lawn chairs. The Simpsons also appeared on the 500mL bottles in their winter attire during the season of Christmas in 2001.

Mr. C.C. Lemon
The Simpsons family is not C.C. Lemon's only mascot. The mascot, Mr. C.C. Lemon, greets people on the official website, and states he is "a sparkling guy who LOVES to make people laugh." He is a barrel chested white man, played by American actor Guy Totaro, dressed entirely in yellow. On his legs, he wears yellow shorts, knee length yellow socks along with yellow high tops, and his top is a yellow T-shirt with the C.C. Lemon logo.

References

External links 
 

Lemon sodas
Japanese drinks
Japanese brands
Products introduced in 1994
Suntory